Strix is a genus of owls in the typical owl family (Strigidae), one of the two generally accepted living families of owls, with the other being the barn-owl (Tytonidae). Common names are earless owls or wood owls, though they are not the only owls without ear tufts, and "wood owl" is also used as a more generic name for forest-dwelling owls. Neotropical birds in the genus Ciccaba are sometimes included in Strix.

These are medium-sized to large, robustly built, powerful owls. They do not have ear tufts and most are highly nocturnal woodland birds. Most prey on small mammals, birds, and reptiles.

Most owls in the genus Strix can be distinguished from other genera of owls through their hooting vocalization and lack of visible ears.

The Latin genus name Strix referred to a mythical vampiric owl-monster believed to suck the blood of infants. Although the genus Strix was established for the earless owls by Linnaeus in 1758, many applied the term to other owls (namely the Tyto) until the late 19th century. This genus is closely related to the extinct Ornimegalonyx.

Taxonomy
The genus Strix was introduced by the Swedish naturalist Carl Linnaeus in 1758 in the tenth edition of his Systema Naturae. The type species is the tawny owl. The genus name is a Latin word meaning "owl".

Species
The genus contains 22 species:
 Spotted wood owl, S. seloputo
 Mottled wood owl, S. ocellata
 Brown wood owl, S. leptogrammica
 Tawny owl, S.  aluco
 Maghreb owl, S.  mauritanica
 Himalayan owl, S. nivicolum
 Desert owl, S. hadorami 
 Omani owl, S. butleri
 Spotted owl, S. occidentalis
 Barred owl, S. varia
 Cinereous owl, S. sartorii
 Fulvous owl, S. fulvescens
 Rusty-barred owl, S. hylophila
 Chaco owl, S. chacoensis
 Rufous-legged owl, S. rufipes
 Ural owl, S. uralensis
 Great grey owl, S. nebulosa
 African wood owl, S. woodfordii
 Mottled owl, Strix virgata
 Black-and-white owl, Strix nigrolineata
 Black-banded owl, Strix huhula
 Rufous-banded owl, Strix albitarsis

Fossil species
The genus Strix is well represented in the fossil record. Being a fairly generic type of strigid owl, they were probably the first truly modern Strigidae to evolve. However, whether several of the species usually placed in this genus indeed belong here is uncertain.

Generally accepted in Strix are:
S. dakota (Early Miocene of South Dakota, USA) – tentatively placed here
Strix sp. (Late Miocene of Nebraska, USA)
Strix sp. (Late Pliocene of Rębielice Królewski, Poland) apparently similar to the great grey owl
Strix intermedia (Early - Middle Pleistocene of EC Europe) – may be paleosubspecies of S. aluco
Strix brea (Late Pleistocene of SW North America) Now placed in its own genus. (See below)

Strix sp. (Late Pleistocene of Ladds, USA)

"Strix" wintershofensis (Early/Middle Miocene of Wintershof West, Germany) and "Strix" edwardsi (Middle Miocene of Grive-Saint-Alban, France), while being strigid owls, have not at present been reliably identified to genus; they might also belong into the European Ninox-like group.

"Strix" ignota (Middle Miocene of Sansan, France) is sometimes erroneously considered a nomen nudum, but this assumption is based on what appears to be a lapsus or misprint in a 1912 source. It may well belong into the present genus, but this requires confirmation.

"Strix" perpasta (Late Miocene – Early Pliocene of Gargano Peninsula, Italy) does not appear to belong into this genus either. It is sometimes considered a junior synonym of a brown fish-owl paleosubspecies.

UMMP V31030, a coracoid from Late Pliocene Rexroad Formation deposits of Kansas (USA), cannot be conclusively assigned to either the present genus or Bubo.

Extinct forms formerly in Strix:
 "Strix" antiqua – now in Prosybris
 "Strix" brea - now Oraristrix brea
 "Strix" brevis – now in Intutula
 "Strix" collongensis – now in Alasio
 "Strix" melitensis and "Strix" sanctialbani – now in Tyto
 "Strix" murivora – male of the Rodrigues scops owl
 "Strix" newtoni and "Strix" sauzieri – male and female of the Mauritius scops owl

References

Further reading
 Milne-Edwards, Alphonse (1869–1871): Recherches anatomiques et paléontologiques pour servir à l'histoire des oiseaux fossiles de la France (Vol. 2). G. Masson, Paris.
 

 
Bird genera
Taxa named by Carl Linnaeus